John Peter Whiteley (born 28 February 1955, Otley, Yorkshire, England) is an English former first-class cricketer.

Whiteley was a right arm off spin bowler and a right-handed batsman.  He played forty five first-class matches for Yorkshire County Cricket Club from 1978 to 1982, and in six List A one day games in 1981.  He took seventy first-class wickets at an average of 34.42, with a best return of 4 wickets for 14 runs against Nottinghamshire, and he made a top score of 20, against Northamptonshire.

He also appeared for the Yorkshire Second XI from 1972 to 1982, and the Gloucestershire Second XI in 1974.

References

External links
Cricket Archive
Cricinfo

1955 births
Living people
Yorkshire cricketers
English cricketers
People from Otley
Cricketers from Yorkshire